Zac McGraw (born June 8, 1997) is an American professional soccer player who plays as a defender for Major League Soccer club Portland Timbers.

Youth and college
McGraw played as part of the USSDA academy side FC Golden State, before playing college soccer at the United States Military Academy in 2016. McGraw made 68 appearances for the Black Knights over four seasons, scoring a single goal and tallying 9 assists. McGraw, who was a four-time First Team All-Patriot League honoree and earned two USCA First Team All-Northeast Region recognition's in 2017 and 2018, and was named a 2019 USCA Third Team All-Northeast Region honoree.

Professional career 
On January 13, 2020, McGraw was drafted 68th overall in the 2020 MLS SuperDraft by Portland Timbers. He became the first ever Army player drafted in MLS history. McGraw signed with the Timbers on June 22, 2020.

McGraw made his first appearance for Portland on May 1, 2021, starting in a 4–1 loss to FC Dallas.

Career statistics

Club

References

External links
West Point Website
Portland Timbers Website
 

1997 births
American soccer players
Army Black Knights men's soccer players
Association football defenders
Living people
Major League Soccer players
MLS Next Pro players
People from Torrance, California
Portland Timbers draft picks
Portland Timbers players
Portland Timbers 2 players
Soccer players from California
Military personnel from California